Touhou Project, a series of bullet hell video games created by Team Shanghai Alice, has been the source of a large number of unofficial derivative works. Among these are fangames: original games, usually created by dojin groups, that use Touhou characters and settings.

References

Fangames
Fangames
Lists of video games